Alpha Male is a 2006 American-British drama film directed by Dan Wilde and starring Jennifer Ehle and Danny Huston.

Plot

Cast
Jennifer Ehle as Alice Ferris
Danny Huston as Jim Ferris
Patrick Baladi as Clive Lamis
Trudie Styler as Brede Norton
Amelia Warner as Elyssa Ferris
Mark Wells as Jack Ferris

Reception
Mark Stevens of the BBC gave the film three stars out of five.

References

External links
 
 

American drama films
British drama films
Films scored by Stephen Warbeck
Films produced by Trudie Styler
2000s English-language films
2000s American films
2000s British films